In basketball, a blocked shot occurs when a defender deflects or stops a field goal attempt without committing a foul. The National Basketball Association's (NBA) block title is awarded to the player with the highest blocks per game average in a given season. The block title was first recognized in the 1973–74 season when statistics on blocks were first compiled. To qualify for the blocks title, the player must appear in at least 70 percent of the season's games (58 games in typical 82-game season). However, a player who appears in fewer than the minimum games may qualify as annual blocks leader if his block total would have still given him the highest average, even had he appeared in the extra required games. This has been the requirement since the 2013–14 season.

Mark Eaton holds the all-time records for total blocks (456) and blocks per game (5.56) in a season; both achieved in the 1984–85 season. Manute Bol holds the rookie records for total blocks and blocks per game when he had 397 and averaged 5.0 in the 1985–86 season. Among active players, Hassan Whiteside had the highest season block average (3.68) in the 2015–16 season.

Kareem Abdul-Jabbar, Eaton and Marcus Camby all won the most block titles, with four. George Johnson, Manute Bol, Hakeem Olajuwon, Dikembe Mutombo, Alonzo Mourning, Theo Ratliff, Dwight Howard, Anthony Davis, and Serge Ibaka have also won the title more than once. Both Mutombo and Camby have also won the most consecutive block titles, with three. Two players have won both the block title and the NBA championship in the same season: Bill Walton in 1977 with the Portland Trail Blazers and Abdul-Jabbar in 1980 with the Los Angeles Lakers.

Key

Annual leaders

Multiple-time leaders

Notes

References
General

Specific

Blocks leaders by season
Blocks leaders by season